Séamus Power (born 4 March 1987) is an Irish professional golfer who plays on the PGA Tour. His notable achievements include winning the 2021 Barbasol Championship and the 2022 Butterfield Bermuda Championship.

Early life and amateur career 
Power was born in Waterford, Ireland. He played college golf at East Tennessee State University where he won five times including the Atlantic Sun Conference Championship in 2007 and 2010.

Professional career
After graduating from ETSU, Power played on mini-tours while attempting to qualify for the Web.com Tour. He won two events on the eGolf Professional Tour in 2014 and earned his Web.com Tour card for 2015 through qualifying school.

Power had two top-10 finishes on the Web.com Tour in 2015 and finished 72nd on the money list, re-earning a card for 2016. In May 2016, he won the United Leasing & Finance Championship, becoming the first Irish player to win on the Web.com Tour. Power also represented Ireland in the 2016 Olympic tournament. 

In July 2021, Power won his first PGA Tour event at the Barbasol Championship. He won the event on the sixth extra hole of a playoff. In doing so, Power became the fifth player from the Republic of Ireland to win a PGA Tour event after Pat Doyle, Peter O'Hara, Pádraig Harrington and Shane Lowry. Power broke into the top 50 for the first time in his career on 17 January 2022, following a third-place finish at the Sony Open in Hawaii. In March 2022, Power earned his maiden Masters Tournament appearance after making the quarter-finals at the 2022 WGC-Dell Technologies Match Play. Power made his third straight major cut, after finishing tied for 12th at the 2022 U.S. Open.

In October 2022, Power won his second PGA Tour event at the Butterfield Bermuda Championship. He shot three rounds of 65 en route to a one shot victory over Thomas Detry.

Professional wins (7)

PGA Tour wins (2)

PGA Tour playoff record (1–0)

Web.com Tour wins (1)

eGolf Professional Tour wins (4)

Results in major championships

"T" = tied

Results in The Players Championship

"T" indicates a tie for a place
CUT = missed the halfway cut
C = Cancelled after the first round due to the COVID-19 pandemic

Results in World Golf Championships

1Cancelled due to the COVID-19 pandemic

QF, R16, R32, R64 = Round in which player lost in match play

NT = No tournament

Team appearances
Amateur
European Boys' Team Championship (representing Ireland): 2005
European Youths' Team Championship (representing Ireland): 2006

Professional
Hero Cup (representing Great Britain & Ireland): 2023

See also
2016 Web.com Tour Finals graduates
2017 Web.com Tour Finals graduates

References

External links

Irish male golfers
East Tennessee State Buccaneers men's golfers
PGA Tour golfers
Olympic golfers of Ireland
Golfers at the 2016 Summer Olympics
Korn Ferry Tour graduates
Sportspeople from Waterford (city)
Golfers from Charlotte, North Carolina
Sportspeople from Las Vegas
1987 births
Living people